The London Philatelist was first published in January 1892 and is the magazine of the Royal Philatelic Society London.

History
From its beginning until 1943 it was published monthly. Since 1991 it has been published ten times annually. An article about its history in the December 2014 issue (the 1303rd) contains a chart with the date and whole number of all its issues. Its contents include coverage of worldwide philatelic and postal history topics. A substantial part of the magazine is composed of original work, usually by members who may have given a display on their topic at the society meetings.

Archive
The London Philatelist from 1892 to the 2010s is available as a set of searchable DVDs which give access to images of the original articles and illustrations.

Editors
Jan 1892 - Feb 1917 M.P. Castle
Apr 1917 - May 1937 Thomas Hall
Jul 1937 - Jan 1940 Col. Henry Wood 
Feb 1940 - Jun 1946 Rev. Alwin Corder Larmour
Jul 1946 - Dec 1954 H.R. Holmes
Jan 1955 - Dec 1974 Arnold Strange
Jan 1975 - Dec 1982 Stuart Rossiter
May 1983 - Jun 2001 George E. Barker
Jul 2001 - Dec 2014 Frank Walton
Jan 2015 - Jun 2017 Steve Jarvis
Jul 2017 - Dec 2019 Seija-Riitta Laakso
Jan 2020 - Anthony Bard

References

External links
The London Philatelist 
Archive of The London Philatelist from 1892 to 1920

1892 establishments in the United Kingdom
Monthly magazines published in the United Kingdom
English-language magazines
Magazines published in London
Magazines established in 1892
Philatelic periodicals
Royal Philatelic Society London